Erinnyis lassauxii, or Lassaux's sphinx, is a moth of the family Sphingidae.

Description 
The species was first described by Jean Baptiste Boisduval in 1859. It lives from northern Argentina, through Central America, and into the lower United States (Texas, New Mexico, and Arizona).

References

External links

Erinnyis
Moths described in 1859